Dioxippe (Ancient Greek: Διωξίππη) is a name in Greek mythology that may refer to:

Dioxippe, one of the Heliades.
Dioxippe, one of the Danaïdes.
Dioxippe, an Amazon.
Dioxippe, wife of Agenor and mother of Sipylus who killed her unwittingly.
Dioxippe, one of Actaeon's dogs.

Notes

References 

 Apollodorus, The Library with an English Translation by Sir James George Frazer, F.B.A., F.R.S. in 2 Volumes, Cambridge, MA, Harvard University Press; London, William Heinemann Ltd. 1921. ISBN 0-674-99135-4. Online version at the Perseus Digital Library. Greek text available from the same website.
Gaius Julius Hyginus, Fabulae from The Myths of Hyginus translated and edited by Mary Grant. University of Kansas Publications in Humanistic Studies. Online version at the Topos Text Project.
 Lucius Mestrius Plutarchus, Morals translated from the Greek by several hands. Corrected and revised by. William W. Goodwin, PH. D. Boston. Little, Brown, and Company. Cambridge. Press Of John Wilson and son. 1874. 5. Online version at the Perseus Digital Library.

Children of Helios
Danaids
Amazons (Greek mythology)
Metamorphoses into trees in Greek mythology